The 1962 World Women's Handball Championship took place in Romania in 1962.

Preliminary round

Group A

Group B

Group C

Main round

Group I

Group II

Classification round

Finals

Final standings

References

 

World Handball Championship tournaments
World
1962
Women's handball in Romania
World Women's Handball Championship
World Women's Handball Championship
1962 in Romanian women's sport